Angelo De Augustine is an American musician residing in Thousand Oaks, California. He has collaborated with and opened for musician Sufjan Stevens.

Early life
His parents were both close to music. When he was 5 years old, his father left home. Angelo wanted to be a professional soccer player in his teens years, but an injury altered his trajectory. He began playing and writing music after receiving a guitar from a family friend.

Career
Angelo De Augustine self-released his first album in 2014, titled Spirals of Silence. In 2017, Angelo De Augustine released his second full-length album and first with Asthmatic Kitty Records, titled Swim Inside The Moon. In a 2018 review of the artist's "Carcassonne," NPR said that De Augustine wrote it for people who dream of visiting small villages and towns in France. NPR characterized the album's mood as being "like waves rushing onto the shore." In 2019, Angelo De Augustine released his third full-length album and second with Asthmatic Kitty Records titled Tomb. The Irish Times described the artist's Tomb album as "his first bona fide studio album" that followed "a series of low-key releases recorded in a bathtub on a reel-to-reel tape machine and a single microphone."

The artist's "Time" single was performed as a duo with musician Sufjan Stevens.

Discography
Studio albums
Spirals of Silence (2014)
Swim Inside the Moon (2017)
Tomb (2019)
A Beginner's Mind (2021) – with Sufjan Stevens

References

Living people
Asthmatic Kitty artists
Year of birth missing (living people)
Place of birth missing (living people)
People from Thousand Oaks, California
Musicians from California